Italo Bettiol (31 July 1926 – 28 December 2022) was an Italian-French film director.

Biography
Bettiol left Italy in 1947 with his brother, Stefano, and emigrated to France in hopes of becoming a painter. Alongside their friend, Stefano Lonati, the trio began working in film animation, notably creating advertisements with puppets produced by "Les Cinéastes associés" in the 1950s. He became a specialist in stop motion. He gained notoriety through animated television series, working alongside Lonati in the series  and Chapi Chapo.

In 1968, Bettiol founded the animation studio  alongside Lonati, Michel Karlof, and Nicole Pichon. After his retirement, he worked on gadgets in his workshop with his wife, Françoise.

Italo Bettiol died in Aniane on 28 December 2022, at the age of 96. His death was announced by the Société Magic.

Filmography

Screenwriter
Albert et Barnabé
Chapi Chapo
Le Jardinier Antoine
Le Jongleur de Notre-Dame
Les KanapoutzLes ViratatoumsTrajectoiresVariationsDirectorChapi ChapoLes EngrenagesLes ViratatoumsPépin la bulle''

References

1926 births
2022 deaths
French film directors
Italian film directors
Italian emigrants to France
People from Trieste